The following lists events that happened during '''2008 in the Republic of Singapore.

Incumbents 
President: S.R. Nathan
Prime Minister: Lee Hsien Loong

Events

January
1 January – All radio stations in Singapore officially very start broadcasting 24-hour seven days one week at midnight stroke SST.
2 January – The School of the Arts is opened, making it the first specialised pre-tertiary arts school in Singapore. 
3 January – The Keppel Bay Bridge is officially opened.
8 January – 
My Paper is relaunched as a full-fledged bilingual newspaper.
Asia Netcom and Pacific Internet successfully merged as Pacnet, Singapore's second ISP. This resulted in its delisting from Nasdaq.
Reflections at Keppel Bay starts construction works, with completion by 2013.
9 January – Singapore Changi Airport Terminal 3 starts operations.
14 January – The Athletes Achievement Awards is launched to recognise Paralympians. The awards are 10 per cent that of the Multi-million dollar Award Programme for Olympians, being launched 15 years ago.
18 January – The Land Transport Gallery is launched. Several enhancements are announced for buses. Among them, the Land Transport Authority will centrally plan bus routes by 2009 with Public Transport Council overseeing bus networks and service quality, 80% of bus services at timings of 10 minutes or less by August 2009, more seamless transfers, distance-based fares by 2009 to remove transfer penalties, an integrated season pass, more bus lanes, pilot bus priority at traffic junctions and mandatory give-way at bus bays by end-2008, seven more integrated bus interchanges, more information panels at 20 bus stops and SMS for bus arrival times, an enhanced Integrated Public Transport Journey Planner by July 2008 and an Integrated Multi-Modal Travel Information System to be developed. Bus services will be made contestable and more niche services will be provided. A community division is set up in LTA with a new programme soon.
19 January – 
Marina at Keppel Bay is officially opened as a yacht facility with world-class restaurants.
The Sports Hub project tender is awarded to Singapore Sports Hub Consortium led by Dragages Singapore Pte Ltd.
23 January – The National University Health System is formed as Singapore's third health cluster.

February
1 February – The Employment and Employability Institute (e2i) is officially launched to help workers find jobs. In addition, a National Continuing Education and Training (CET) Masterplan is launched too.
8 February – Sumatran orangutan Ah Meng, known for a tourism icon of Singapore, dies after 97 Orangutan Years, or 47 years.
21 February- The President of IOC, Jacques Rogge announces that Singapore will host the inaugural 2010 Summer Youth Olympics, which happened on 14 August 2010.
27 February – Mas Selamat bin Kastari, one of Singapore's wanted fugitive, has escaped from detention under the country's Internal Security Act.

March
4 March – A new School of Science and Technology, Singapore will be set up by 2010.
6 March – A 43-year-old murder suspect is shot dead by police officers at Outram Park MRT station along the North East MRT line. This comes after the suspect attempted to lunge at two officers with a knife as they checked him.
7 March – The Underground Ammunition Facility is commissioned for underground storage of ammunition, saving land aboveground.
8 March – Playground @ Big Splash opens, replacing the previous Big Splash waterpark.
30 March – The Land Transport Master Plan 2008 is launched.
31 March – Changi Airport Terminal 3's shopping and dining facilities are launched.

April
1 April – 
The Workplace Safety and Health Council is formed to raise workplace safety and health standards.
Alexandra Health is formed as Singapore's fourth healthcare cluster, which moved to Khoo Teck Puat Hospital in 2010.
2 April – The Casino Regulatory Authority of Singapore is formed to regulate casinos after its legalization in 2005.
11 April – Wessex Village Square @ one-north is launched, providing a space for art exhibitions and works to be shown.
28 April – During the Workplace Safety and Health Council launch, a target to reduce fatality rate is announced to bring it down to 1.8 per 100,000 workers by 2018.
30 April – SMRT launches the SMRT is Green campaign to promote sustainability, with a new Euro 5 bus launched too. Several new eco-friendly vehicles will be put on the road soon.

May
10 May – HortPark, Henderson Waves and Alexandra Arch are officially opened as part of a plan to link the Southern Ridges.
23 May – The International Court of Justice (ICJ) awards Pedra Branca to Singapore and Middle Rocks to Malaysia, ending a 29-year territorial dispute between the two countries.
28 May – The Land Transport Authority has announced that there are no plans to develop the Jurong LRT for now due to the lack of demand.

June
 23 June – The Singapore National Paralympic Council is formed to focus on para athletes.
 27 June – Phase 2B of Fusionopolis (known as Solaris) starts construction.

July
 5 July – DigiPen's Singapore campus is officially opened, the first international location.
 11 July – 
The Land Transport Authority announced that another platform will be built at Jurong East MRT station called the Jurong East Modification Project. It is targeted for completion by 2012, but eventually opened earlier on 27 May 2011. 17 more trains will also be added.
The Reform Party is inaugurated.
The F1 Pit Building is completed in preparation of the Singapore Grand Prix.
 15 July – The locations of the stations along Downtown MRT line Stage 2 are unveiled.
 25 July – Changi Airport Terminal 3 is officially opened. Plans for Terminal 4 are announced to allow Changi Airport to expand its capacity.
 31 July – 
Money No Enough 2 is released, 10 years after Money No Enough is out in cinemas.
Radio Singapore International ceases transmission due to declining listenership.

August
 8 – 24 August – Team Singapore took part in the 2008 Summer Olympics in Beijing. The team won only one silver Olympic medal (for the Women's Table Tennis team event) during the run, the first time the nation won a medal after 48 years after its first medal- also a silver—by Tan Howe Liang in the 1960 Summer Olympics, placing 72nd out of 87 NOCs.
 20 August – Pro-family policies are enhanced to encourage child-bearing. Several of these measures include tax reliefs, kindergarten education, 16 weeks for maternity leave and six-day childcare leave for each parent from 1 January 2009, a six-day unpaid infant care leave, Government co-funding for assisted reproductive technology from 1 September, among others.
 24 August – The MacRitchie Viaduct extension opens to traffic, supposed to open last month.
 26 August – The Provisional Admission Exercise will be merged into the Joint Admission Exercise after moves to shorten marking of exams, first announced in 2006. The move will take effect in 2009.
 28 August – Changi Airport Terminal 3's Butterfly Garden is opened.

September
1 September – The Singapore Pharmacy Council is formed, replacing the previous Singapore Pharmacy Board.
5 September – The Murai Urban Training Facility is officially opened, making it the SAF's first such facility.
6 – 17 September – Team Singapore took part in the 2008 Summer Paralympics in Beijing.
9 September – Equestrian rider Laurentia Tan wins Singapore's first-ever Paralympic medal, a bronze. She wins another bronze medal on 11 September.
13 September – Swimmer Yip Pin Xiu wins Singapore's first Paralympic silver medal. She wins Singapore's first Paralympic gold medal on 15 September.
20 September – The Kallang-Paya Lebar Expressway is opened.
26 September – Construction starts on a second tower beside OUB Centre, which will be completed by 2011. The building is officially opened in 2012.
28 September – Singapore held a leg of the 2008 Formula One World Championship, called the SingTel Singapore Grand Prix; it was the first time the F1 Grand Prix was held in Singapore, and the first F1 race held at night.
End September – Singapore slips into the Global Financial Crisis.

October

1 October – Bus and train fares are adjusted by 0.7%.
10 October – The first issue of tabla! is launched, an English newspaper that caters to the Indian diaspora.
13 October – The Jewel Box's new extension in Mount Faber is officially opened.
17 October – Phase 1 of Fusionopolis (which have three office towers) is opened.
19 October – MediaCorp launches two free-to-air TV channels, okto and Vasantham, to replace Central.
30 October – Sing to the Dawn is released.
31 October – Marina Barrage is opened, making it Singapore's 15th reservoir. The Barrage will help to prevent flooding in the city centre, and serves as a place of recreation.

November
3 November – Keppel Corporation completes building two icebreakers for the Arctic, the first in Asia as well as the first time being done in the tropics.
7 November – Bombardier Transportation is awarded a contract for Downtown MRT line trains, part of six contracts awarded for the new line.
10 November – A second school for those who did not do well in PSLE, the Assumption Pathway School, will start taking in students from 2009.
21 November – Awards under the Athletes Achievement Awards scheme are doubled for Paralympians after increased funding announced by Tote Board, which will fund the full sum compared to previously. This comes after a debate on differences in rewarding able-bodied and disabled athletes.

December
1 December - Sembawang Shopping Centre is reopened to the public after the renovation in 2007.
23 December – Singapore Flyer stops for six hours due to technical problems.

Date unknown
 The 1st phase of the Deep Tunnel Sewerage System is completed.
 The Singapore Totalisator Board is renamed to Tote Board.
 The Common Services Tunnel is completed.

Deaths 
 4 January – Jimmy Nah, Singaporean comedian and actor (b. 1967).
 7 January – Robert Chandran, Singaporean businessman (b. 1950).
 8 February – Chua Ek Kay, Singaporean artist (b. 1947).
 28 March – Myint Thein, Myanmar activist (b. 1947).
 12 May – Choo Hwee Lim, music pioneer (b. 1931).
 20 May – Ali Sadikin, Indonesian politician (b. 1928).
 28 June – Gregory Yong, second archbishop of Singapore from 1977 to 2000 (b. 1925).
 14 July – Ong Chit Chung, Singaporean politician and historian, MP for Jurong GRC for Bukit Batok (b. 1949).
 28 July – Syahrir, Indonesian economist (b. 1945).
 5 September – Constance Mary Turnbull, author of A History of Singapore (b. 1927).
 6 September – Nicole Lai, singer (b. 1974).
 30 September – Joshua Benjamin Jeyaretnam, Singaporean politician and former Workers' Party secretary-general and Reform Party founder (b. 1926).
 3 October – Teo Soo Chuan, Singaporean businessman, President of Ngee Ann Kongsi (b. 1918).
 28 November – Lo Hwei Yen, Singaporean journalist, was a casualty in the November 2008 Mumbai attacks (b. 1980).
 5 December – Ho See Beng, union leader, Member of Parliament (b. 1918).

Notes

 
Years of the 21st century in Singapore